Jason Alistaire Forster (born 25 February 1971, in Derby) is a former international Wales rugby union player. A flanker, he played his club rugby for Pontypridd RFC, Newport RFC and Newport Gwent Dragons. He moved on to be player – coach at Doncaster R.F.C. before returning to Wales to coach at Neath RFC.

References

External links
Newport Gwent Dragons profile

1971 births
Barbarian F.C. players
Bridgend RFC players
Cross Keys RFC players
Doncaster R.F.C. players
Living people
Dragons RFC players
Newport RFC players
Rugby union players from Derby
Pontypridd RFC players
Rugby union flankers
Swansea RFC players
Wales international rugby union players